Richard Dean Johnson (February 3, 1935 – May 26, 2022) was an Iowa State Auditor from 1979–2003.

Johnson was born on February 3, 1935, in Spencer, Nebraska, and died on May 26, 2022, in Ankeny, Iowa. He is buried at Sheldahl Cemetery in Sheldahl, Iowa.

References

1935 births
2022 deaths
Iowa Republicans
State Auditors of Iowa
20th-century American politicians
People from Boyd County, Nebraska